Ana Arzoumanian (born 21 April 1962) is an Argentine lawyer, writer, poet, and translator.

Biography
Ana Arzoumanian was born in Buenos Aires in 1962, a descendant of Armenian immigrants and the granddaughter of survivors of the Armenian genocide. She currently resides in Buenos Aires.

Education
Arzoumanian earned a law degree from the Universidad del Salvador's Faculty of Legal Sciences. She completed a postgraduate degree in psychoanalysis at the Lacanian Orientation School of Buenos Aires.

Academic career
Arzoumanian was a professor of philosophy of law at the Universidad del Salvador's Faculty of Legal Sciences from 1998 to 2001. From 2015 to 2016 she worked as a professor in the International Postgraduate Course in Creative Writing of the Latin American Social Sciences Institute (FLACSO) and as a visiting teacher to the Decolonia team of the Faculty of Law's social department at the University of Buenos Aires.

She attended the admittance of patients at the Borda Neuropsychiatric Hospital and the Hospital Argerich in Buenos Aires.

In 1992, she was an active member of the first arbitration course in Argentina, given by the National Training and Communication Directorate of the Ministry of Justice and Human Rights.

She is a member of the International Association of Genocide Scholars.

Literary career
Arzoumanian has published several poetry collections with themes such as Armenian heritage, genocide, historical figures, and men's power over women. Her book Juana I, about Joanna of Castile, was adapted into the play La que necesita una boca in 2007.

She has translated works by Bonaventure des Périers, Susan Gubar, and Levon Khechoyan into Spanish.

Awards and recognitions

 2008: Yad Vashem International Scholarship for study of the Holocaust
 2009: Lucian Freud Accésit Award from Proyecto al Sur

Works

Books
 
 
 
 
 
 
 
 
 
 
 
 
  (poetic version and prologue)

Anthologies
 Velarde (2011), Secretary of Culture of San Luis Potosí

Translations
 El alambre no se percibía entre la hierba. Relatos de la guerra de Karabagh (2015), Levón Khechoyan, Hovhannés Yeranyan, Hecho Atómico. . Co-produced with Alice Ter Ghevondian.
 Cymbalum Mundi. Bonaventure des Périers (2014), Alción.
 Im anune hima e (2013), Editorial Antares. . Translation of the poem Káukasos into Armenian by Alice Ter Ghevondian.
 Un idioma también es un incendio. 20 poetas de Armenia (2013), Alción-Activo Puente. . Co-produced with Alice Ter Ghevondian.
 Lo largo y lo corto del verso Holocausto (2007), Susan Gubar, Alción.
 Sade y la escritura de la orgía, Poder y parodia en Historia de Juliette (2006), Lucienne Frappier-Mazur, Ediciones Artes del Sur.

Film appearances
 A – díalogos sin fronteras (2012), directed by Ignacio Dimattia

Theatrical adaptations of Arzoumanian's work
 La que necesita una boca, (2007). Directed by Román Caracciolo. Adapted from Juana I.
 Tengo un apuro de un siglo (2016). Directed by Román Caracciolo. Adapted from Del vodka hecho con moras, as well as El alambre no se percibía entre la hierba by Hovhannés Yeranyan.

References

External links

 

1962 births
20th-century Argentine poets
21st-century Argentine poets
Argentine translators
Argentine women essayists
Argentine essayists
Argentine women lawyers
20th-century Argentine lawyers
Argentine women poets
French–Spanish translators
Living people
Universidad del Salvador alumni
Writers from Buenos Aires